Stomopteryx tesserapunctella is a moth of the family Gelechiidae. It was described by Hans Georg Amsel in 1935. It is found in Palestine.

References

Moths described in 1935
Stomopteryx